Ayawasi Airport (IATA: AYW, ICAO: WASA) is an airport in the village of Ayawasi, in the Indonesian province of Southwest Papua. It is being constructed to replace the Domine Edward Osok Airport in Sorong, but also serve the area around Sorong.

References

Airports in Southwest Papua